Alexander Whitelaw (1803–1846) was a Scottish editor and writer.

Life
Whitelaw was born in Glasgow, and became an assistant to Robert Watt in the compilation of Bibliotheca Britannica. He later was a journalist and poet. Hired by the publishers Blackie, he edited illustrated books; he also edited the Popular Encyclopedia or Conversations Lexicon, which appeared from 1834 to 1842.

Edited works
The Casquet of Literary Gems (1828)
The Republic of Letters (1833)
Works of Robert Burns, 2 vols., 1843–4
The Book of Scottish Song (1844)
The Book of Scottish Ballads (1845)

Notes

1803 births
1846 deaths
Scottish book editors
Scottish journalists
19th-century Scottish poets
Scottish male writers
British male poets
Writers from Glasgow
19th-century British male writers